Thomas G. Baffes (April 3, 1923 – June 15, 1997) was an American surgeon and attorney noted for developing a surgical procedure to repair a heart defect known as transposition of the great vessels, which often caused "blue baby" deaths.

Early life and education 
Baffes was born in New Orleans, Louisiana, to Greek immigrant parents, Gustave "Gus" Baffes (1893-) (English attribution for the Greek name Konstantinos) and Tina (née Bores) (1905-). They came from Tripoli, Greece. Thomas had one younger sister, Bessie and one younger brother, Christian. He received his M.D. from Tulane University Medical School.

Career 
Baffes was chairman of the surgery department at Mt. Sinai Hospital Medical Center in Chicago. He was also a partner in a Chicago law firm, Pierce Daley Baffes and O'Sullivan, and taught classes at DePaul University Law School.

References 

1923 births
1997 deaths
American surgeons
20th-century American physicians
20th-century surgeons